A stirrup pump is a portable reciprocating water pump used to extinguish or control small fires. It is operated by hand. The operator places a foot on a stirrup-like bracket at the bottom of the pump to hold the pump steady, the bottom of the suction cylinder was placed inside a bucket of water.

References

External links

 Fire watchers

Pumps
Appropriate technology
Human power
Firefighting equipment
Fire suppression
Active fire protection